Herbert Gleason may refer to:

 Jackie Gleason (John Herbert Gleason, 1916–1987), American comedian, actor and musician
 Herbert P. Gleason (1928–2013), American lawyer